Wiesław Cempa (born 1 July 1970) is a Polish cross-country skier. He competed in the men's 10 kilometre classical event at the 1992 Winter Olympics.

References

1970 births
Living people
Polish male cross-country skiers
Olympic cross-country skiers of Poland
Cross-country skiers at the 1992 Winter Olympics
Sportspeople from Nowy Sącz